CCE Wakefield is a large soft drinks factory in West Yorkshire owned by Coca-Cola Enterprises UK; it is the largest soft-drinks factory in Europe (by volume of drinks produced).

History
It was built in 1989 at the Wakefield 41 Business Park in Outwood. From the five years after 2009, Coca-Cola invested over £100m in the plant, and £240m had been invested at the site before 2009. The main office of CCEP is in Milton Keynes. The site was visited by David Cameron, when Prime Minister, in 2010 and June 2014.

Coca-Cola has six factories in the UK.

Production
The site produces 6,000 cans of soft drinks per minute, which is 100 per second, and up to 2,200 PET bottles a minute (HDPE bottle caps); this works out to up to one billion litres of soft drink a year. The factory can produce 40,000 PET bottles (empty) an hour.

Next door is a factory of (former) Rexam, that produces the metal cans.

Structure
The site has an area the size of 16 football pitches, but when aggregated with the company's own solar farm ( further north), the footprint covers 33 football pitches.

See also
 Arla Aylesbury, UK's and world's largest dairy

References

External links
 Manufacturing at Coca-Cola UK

1989 establishments in England
Buildings and structures in Wakefield
Coca-Cola buildings and structures
Commercial buildings completed in 1989
Economy of West Yorkshire
Manufacturing plants in England